Aporrhais is a genus of medium-sized sea snails, marine gastropod mollusks in the family Aporrhaidae and the superfamily Stromboidea.

The genus is known from the Triassic to the Recent periods (age range: 205.6 to 0.0 million years ago). Fossils of species within this genus have been found all over the world.

Species
This genus contains the following extant species:
 Aporrhais elegantissima Parenzan, 1970
 Aporrhais pesgallinae Barnard, 1963
 Aporrhais pespelecani (Linnaeus, 1758), common pelican's foot
 Aporrhais senegalensis Gray, 1838
 Aporrhais serresiana (Michaud, 1828)

Extinct species within this genus include:
 †Aporrhais dingdenensis  Marquet 2002
 † Aporrhais peralata (Sacco, 1893) 
 † Aporrhais pliorara (Sacco, 1893) 
 †Aporrhais pugens  Wollemann 1908
 †Aporrhais speciosa  Schlotheim 1820
 †Aporrhais uttingeriana  (Risso, 1826)  

Species brought into synonymy
 Aporrhais aldrovandi Capellini, 1860: synonym of Aporrhais pespelecani (Linnaeus, 1758)
 † Aporrhais angulata Gabb, 1864: synonym of † Anchura angulata (Gabb, 1864)
 Aporrhais francheti Rochebrune, 1883: synonym of Aporrhais senegalensis Gray, 1838
 Aporrhais macandreae Jeffreys, 1867: synonym of Aporrhais serresianus (Michaud, 1828)
 Aporrhais michaudi Locard, 1890: synonym of Aporrhais pespelecani (Linnaeus, 1758)
 Aporrhais occidentalis Beck, 1836 : synonym of Arrhoges occidentalis (Beck, 1836)
 Aporrhais pelecanipes Locard, 1892: synonym of Aporrhais pespelecani (Linnaeus, 1758)
 Aporrhais pes-gallinae Barnard: synonym of Aporrhais pesgallinae Barnard, 1963
 Aporrhais pespelicani (Linnaeus, 1758): synonym of Aporrhais pespelecani (Linnaeus, 1758)
 Aporrhais quadrifidus da Costa, 1778: synonym of Aporrhais pespelecani (Linnaeus, 1758)
 Aporrhais sarsii Kobelt, 1908: synonym of Aporrhais serresianus (Michaud, 1828)
 Aporrhais serreseanus [sic]: synonym of Aporrhais serresianus (Michaud, 1828)
 † Aporrhais vetus Packard, 1922: synonym of † Alarimella veta (Packard, 1922)

References

 Cosel R. von (1977). Die Arten der Gattung Aporrhais Da Costa im Ostatlantik und Beobachtungen zum Umdrehreflex der Pelikanfuss-Schnecke Aporrhais pespelicani. Drosera 77: 37-46
 Gofas, S.; Le Renard, J.; Bouchet, P. (2001). Mollusca, in: Costello, M.J. et al. (Ed.) (2001). European register of marine species: a check-list of the marine species in Europe and a bibliography of guides to their identification. Collection Patrimoines Naturels, 50: pp. 180–213
 Manganelli, G.; Spadini, V.; Fiorentino, V. (2008). The lost Aporrhais species from the Italian Pliocene: A. peralata Sacco, 1893 (Gastropoda Caenogastropoda). Journal of Conchology. 39(5): 493-515

External links
 Da Costa, Mendes E. (1778). Historia naturalis testaceorum Britanniæ, or, the British conchology; containing the descriptions and other particulars of natural history of the shells of Great Britain and Ireland: illustrated with figures. In English and French. - Historia naturalis testaceorum Britanniæ, ou, la conchologie Britannique; contenant les descriptions & autres particularités d'histoire naturelle des coquilles de la Grande Bretagne & de l'Irlande: avec figures en taille douce. En anglois & françois., i-xii, 1-254, i-vii, [1, Pl. I-XVII. London. (Millan, White, Emsley & Robson)]

Aporrhaidae
Gastropod genera
Rhaetian first appearances
Extant Late Triassic first appearances
Taxa named by Emanuel Mendes da Costa